This is a list of the Bulgaria national football team results from 1990 to 1999.

Results

1990

1991

1992

1993

1994

1995

1996

1997

1998

1999

References

Notes

External links

Bulgaria national football team results